Max Doria (November 20, 1896 in Amiens, France  - December 19, 1989) was a French actor.

Filmography
 1980-83 : Julien Fontanes, magistrat

External links
 

1896 births
1989 deaths
People from Amiens
French male film actors
French male television actors
French male stage actors
20th-century French male actors